Ariosto Appling Wiley (November 6, 1848 – June 17, 1908) was a U.S. Representative from Alabama, brother of Oliver Cicero Wiley.

Early life
Born in Clayton, Alabama, Wiley moved with his parents to Troy, Alabama.  He attended the common schools and was graduated from Emory and Henry College, Emory, Virginia, in 1870.  He studied law, was admitted to the bar in 1871 and commenced practice in Clayton, Alabama.  He moved to Montgomery, Alabama, the same year and continued the practice of law.

Military service and entry into politics
He was captain of a Cavalry troop of the Alabama National Guard and later a lieutenant colonel commanding the Second Regiment of Infantry of the Alabama National Guard. He served as member of the Alabama House of Representatives in 1884, 1885, 1888, 1889, 1896, and 1897. He served in the Alabama Senate in 1890–1893, 1898, and 1899.

He was appointed by President McKinley on June 9, 1898, lieutenant colonel of the Fifth Regiment, United States Volunteer Infantry, and served during the Spanish–American War. He served as legal adviser and chief of staff to Gen. Henry W. Lawton in Santiago, Cuba, and assisted Gen. Leonard Wood in the establishment of civil government in the eastern Province. He served as delegate to the Democratic National Convention in 1888.

Congressional career and death
Wiley was elected as a Democrat to the Fifty-seventh and to the three succeeding Congresses and served from March 4, 1901, until his death at Hot Springs, Virginia, June 17, 1908. He was interred in Oakwood Cemetery, Montgomery, Alabama.

See also
List of United States Congress members who died in office (1900–49)

References

 Retrieved on May 14, 2009

External links

1848 births
1908 deaths
Democratic Party members of the Alabama House of Representatives
Democratic Party Alabama state senators
American military personnel of the Spanish–American War
Alabama lawyers
Emory and Henry College alumni
People from Clayton, Alabama
National Guard (United States) officers
Democratic Party members of the United States House of Representatives from Alabama
19th-century American politicians
20th-century American politicians